Goričica pri Ihanu is a small settlement east of Ihan in the Municipality of Domžale in the Upper Carniola region of Slovenia.

Name
The name of the settlement was changed from Goričica to Goričica pri Ihanu in 1953.

Church

The church in Goričica pri Ihanu stands on a hill in the northern part of the village. It is dedicated to Saint Cunigunde of Luxembourg.

References

External links 

Goričica pri Ihanu on Geopedia

Populated places in the Municipality of Domžale